Casey E. Luna (born May 26, 1931) is an American politician, businessman, and racing driver who served as Lieutenant Governor of New Mexico from 1991 to 1995, under Governor Bruce King. He is also a businessman who formerly ran an automobile dealership in Belen, New Mexico.

Biography
Luna was born on May 26, 1931, to Casimiro Luna and Ruby Armenta. He was born in Canon de Jemez (modern day Jemez Pueblo). His parents separated when Luna was roughly 13, and he attended Albuquerque High School, although he did not graduate. He worked as a bicycle delivery boy for Western Union, once personally delivering a telegram to Harry S. Truman in 1948. Also in 1948, he joined the United States Army and was trained as a medic. His automotive career began when he took a job at a car dealership in Albuquerque. He later filled in as a driver for a race car sponsored by the dealership, later winning the 1955 and 1956 track championships at Speedway Park in Albuquerque. He then owned a sprint car racing team, Casey Luna Ford, from 1985 to 1996. He also owned a car dealership, Casey Luna Ford-Mercury.

In 1986, he mounted a bid to become Lieutenant Governor of New Mexico as a Democrat, but did not win. He ran again in 1990 and won, becoming Lieutenant Governor to Governor Bruce King. He was not included in King's advisory circle, which frustrated him.

In 1994, he challenged King in the Democratic gubernatorial primary, but lost. King would go on to lose the general election to businessman Gary Johnson. Luna left office on January 1, 1995, and was succeeded by Walter Bradley.

He has a wife, Beverly, and at least one daughter.

See also 
 List of minority governors and lieutenant governors in the United States

References

Living people
1931 births
Businesspeople from New Mexico
Lieutenant Governors of New Mexico
New Mexico Democrats
People from Belen, New Mexico